The anterior talocalcaneal ligament (anterior calcaneo-astragaloid ligament or anterior interosseous ligament) is a ligament in the foot.

The anterior talocalcaneal ligament extends from the front and lateral surface of the neck of the talus to the sinus tarsi of the calcaneus.

It forms the posterior boundary of the talocalcaneonavicular joint.

References

Ligaments of the lower limb